The 2015 Virginia Cavaliers football team represented the University of Virginia in the 2015 NCAA Division I FBS football season. The Cavaliers were led by sixth year head coach Mike London and played their home games at Scott Stadium. They were members of the Coastal Division of the Atlantic Coast Conference. They finished the season 4–8, 3–5 in ACC play to finish in sixth place in the Coastal Division.

On November 29, head coach Mike London resigned. He finished at Virginia with a six year record of 27–46.

Last season
The 2014 Cavaliers finished with a record of 5–7, 3–5 in ACC play to finish in a three way tie for fifth place in the Coastal Division.

Roster

Coaching changes
On December 14, 2014, offensive line coach Scott Wachenheim was named head coach of the VMI Keydets. On January 6, 2015, Tom O'Brien officially retired. Eight days later, Chris Beatty and Dave Borbely were hired as running backs and offensive line coaches, respectively, with Larry Lewis taking over responsibilities as tight ends coach.

Depth chart

Schedule

Schedule Source:

Game summaries

UCLA

Notre Dame

William & Mary

Boise State

Pittsburgh

Syracuse

North Carolina

Georgia Tech

Miami (FL)

Louisville

Duke

Virginia Tech

References

Virginia
Virginia Cavaliers football seasons
Virginia Cavaliers football